Mary Heaton (24 February 1911 – 30 March 1989) was a British gymnast. She competed in the women's artistic team all-around event at the 1936 Summer Olympics.

References

External links
 

1911 births
1989 deaths
British female artistic gymnasts
Olympic gymnasts of Great Britain
Gymnasts at the 1936 Summer Olympics
Place of birth missing
20th-century British women